Rüdesheimer Platz is a Berlin U-Bahn station located in the Wilmersdorf district on the  line.

The station opened on 12 October 1913. The eponymous square was named after the town of Rüdesheim am Rhein in Hesse, famous for its Rheingau wines. Wilhelm Leitgebel constructed it like the nearby station Heidelberger Platz and Breitenbachplatz in a very pompous way. Mosaics, many details and granite columns can be found there. It was closed a few months during the war, opened in 1945 and renovated in 1988. Since then, pictures are shown on the walls of the station. In 2005, the platform of the station was renovated again (new color, new floor).

References 

U3 (Berlin U-Bahn) stations
Buildings and structures in Charlottenburg-Wilmersdorf
Railway stations in Germany opened in 1913